Santa Lucía is a city in the Canelones Department of southern Uruguay.

Santa Lucía is also the name of the municipality to which the city belongs.

Geography
the centre of Montevideo. The river Río Santa Lucía, after which the city is named, flows along the northwestern limits of the city.

History 
Santa Lucía was founded in 1782 with the name of Villa San Juan Bautista. It had acquired the status of "Villa" (town) before the Independence of Uruguay. On 15 June 1925, its status was elevated to "Ciudad" (city) by the Act of Ley Nº 7.837.

Population 
According to the 2011 census, Santa Lucía had a population of 16,742. In 2010, the Intendencia de Canelones estimated a population of 18,346  for the municipality during the elections.

 
Source: Instituto Nacional de Estadística de Uruguay

Places of worship 
 Church of St. John the Baptist (Roman Catholic)

Government 
The city mayor as of July 2010 is Raúl Estramín.

Notable people 
 José Cancela (1976), football player.
 Ángelo Paleso (1983), football player.
 Clemente Estable (1894–1976), writer.
 Walter Santoro (1922–2011), politician.
 Eugenio Figueredo (1932), President of CONMEBOL

References

External links 

Guide of Santa Lucía 
INE map of Santa Lucia

Populated places in the Canelones Department
Populated places established in 1782
1782 establishments in the Viceroyalty of the Río de la Plata